David Benjamin Waymer Jr. (July 1, 1958 – April 30, 1993) was an American football safety in the National Football League (NFL).

Waymer graduated from West Charlotte High School in 1976.  He played college football at Notre Dame, graduating in 1980, and was drafted in the 1980 NFL Draft in the second round by the New Orleans Saints, where he played until 1989. He was offered a contract by the New Jersey Generals of the United States Football League (USFL), but opted to remain in New Orleans, saying, "I always wanted to play there. I've got a lot of friends there, and that is where, hopefully, I'll finish out my career." He played for the San Francisco 49ers in 1990 and 1991 and the Los Angeles Raiders in 1992.

During the 1993 offseason, Waymer died on April 30, 1993, at the age of 34, from a heart attack induced by cocaine use.

ABC/Wonderful World of Disney movie A Saintly Switch was dedicated to Waymer's memory in 1999.

January 24, 2022 the Canal Street Chronicles featured Waymer in their "LIFE OF A SAINT" series.
Family, friends and teammates come together to share their memories of the late Dave Waymer.

References

External links
 Pro Football Reference: Dave Waymer
 Football Database: Dave Waymer Career Stats

1958 births
1993 deaths
American football cornerbacks
American football safeties
Los Angeles Raiders players
National Conference Pro Bowl players
New Orleans Saints players
Notre Dame Fighting Irish football players
San Francisco 49ers players
Cocaine-related deaths in California
Sportspeople from Brooklyn
Players of American football from New York City
Ed Block Courage Award recipients